Ghosts is the second studio album by singer Siobhán Donaghy. Released on 25 June 2007, the album peaked at #92 on the UK Albums Chart. This album received more media attention than her debut album, but was overall a commercial failure despite receiving excellent critical reviews. The album spawned two singles, "Don't Give It Up" and "So You Say", which were both moderately successful. This is Donaghy's only studio album with Parlophone, as she parted ways with the label in August 2008.

Manufacturing error
The album was the subject of a manufacturing error just prior to its release, with Donaghy later confirming, "When Ghosts came out, it didn't go on a new release shelf in any shop because it got delivered and there'd been a mistake on the production line. I've never heard the music that was on the CDs, but it wasn't my album. When the stores were told about it, the album was lifted off the shelves and taken back. By the time it was ready, a lot of the stores didn't take it back because they were pissed off."

Track listing

Charts

Sources

2007 albums
Albums produced by Marius de Vries
Parlophone albums
Siobhán Donaghy albums

pt:Ghosts